Abronia mixteca , the Mixtecan arboreal alligator lizard, is a vulnerable species of arboreal alligator lizards described in 1967 by Charles Mitchill Bogert and Ann Porter. It is endemic to the Guerrero and Oaxaca states of Mexico.

References

Abronia
Endemic reptiles of Mexico
Reptiles described in 1967
Taxa named by Charles Mitchill Bogert